was a town located in Higashiiwai District, Iwate Prefecture, Japan. The name translates as 'one thousand stables' although today there are no horses or stables remaining.

Senmaya village was created on April 1, 1889 with the establishment of the municipalities system. It was raised to town status on April 1, 1898. On September 30, 1956, Senmaya annexed the neighboring villages of Iwashimizu, Okutama and Konashi.
On September 20, 2005, Senmaya, along with the towns of Daitō and Higashiyama, the villages of Kawasaki and Murone (all from Higashiiwai District), and the town of Hanaizumi (from Nishiiwai District), was merged into the expanded city of Ichinoseki and no longer exists as an independent municipality.

As of September 2005, the town had an estimated population of 12,969 and a population density of 144.36 persons per km². The total area was 89.84 km².

Climate

References

External links
Official website  
 Events, Stores, and Sightseeing  

Dissolved municipalities of Iwate Prefecture
Ichinoseki, Iwate